Diablo Formation may refer to:
 Diablo Formation, California, Neogene geologic formation of California
 Diablo Formation, Colombia, Oligocene geologic formation of Colombia